Prats-Saint-Thomas is a former commune in Pyrénées-Orientales (France).

Geography

Location 
Prats-Saint-Thomas is located west of Fontpédrouse.

Hydrography 
The river Têt runs through the north of Prats-Saint-Thomas, from the west to the east.

History 
The commune of Prats-Saint-Thomas was created in 1793 by uniting the hamlets of Prats-Balaguer and Saint-Thomas. Since 26 June 1822, it was linked with Fontpédrouse.

Part of the hamlets were destroyed in December 1932 because of heavy rains which caused several landslides.

Sites of interest 
 Church of Trinity and Saint Mary of Prats-Balaguer, from the 11th century.

Notes 

Former communes of Pyrénées-Orientales